Singles and Beyond is a compilation album by American indie rock band The Olivia Tremor Control, consisting of several rare or out-of-print tracks by the band.

Track listing
All songs written by The Olivia Tremor Control.

"Love Athena" – 2:39
"Today I Lost a Tooth" – 1:20
"California Demise Pt. 1" – 1:21
"California Demise Pt. 2" – 1:13
"A Sunshine Fix" – 2:48
"Fireplace" – 3:28
"Collage #1" – 3:51
"Beneath the Climb" – 2:40
"I Won This Dog at the Driftwood Reunion Carnival" – 1:18
"Christmas with William S." – 2:54
"The Giant Day" – 1:50
"Shaving Spiders" – 2:24
"The Princess Turns the Key to Cubist Castle (Curtain Call Pt. 1&2)" – 2:24
"Curtain Call Pt. 3" – 1:10
"I'm Not Feeling Human" – 1:52
"The Giant Day (Dusk)" – 3:33
"Late Music 2" – 3:42
"Gypsum Oil Field Fire" – 3:40
"King of the Claws" – 2:10
"The Ships" – 4:32

Notes
Tracks 1–6 from California Demise EP.
Track 7 from Ptolemaic Terrascope's Terrastock Festival compilation.
Track 8 from a Cassiel Records compilation that the band notes to this day they've never seen.  Note from former Cassiel proprietor: Cassiel shipped 10 copies per agreement to Will and Bill, who let the rental on their PO box lapse without leaving a forwarding address.
Track 9 from Soundtrack to the Bible Belt.
Track 10 from Christmas in Stereo.
Tracks 11–16 from The Giant Day EP.
Track 17 from Treble Revolution, Vol. 2.
Tracks 18–19 from 7" split single with The Apples in Stereo.
Track 20 from Ptolemaic Terrascope's Succour compilation.

References

2000 compilation albums
The Olivia Tremor Control albums
Emperor Norton Records albums